The Medical and Health Services functional constituency is a functional constituency seat in the Legislative Council of Hong Kong first created for the 2021 Legislative Council election, combined from the Medical and Health Services functional constituencies. It has the second largest voter base in the functional constituencies after Education functional constituency.

Return members

Electoral results

2020s

References

Constituencies of Hong Kong
Constituencies of Hong Kong Legislative Council
Functional constituencies (Hong Kong)
2021 establishments in Hong Kong
Constituencies established in 2021